In mathematics, the reflexive closure of a binary relation R on a set X is the smallest reflexive relation on X that contains R.

For example,  if X is a set of distinct numbers and x R y means "x is less than y", then the reflexive closure of R is the relation "x is less than or equal to y".

Definition 

The reflexive closure S of a relation R on a set X is given by

In English, the reflexive closure of R is the union of R with the identity relation on X.

Example 

As an example, if

then the relation  is already reflexive by itself, so it does not differ from its reflexive closure.

For example, if on the same set 

then the reflexive closure is

See also 

 Transitive closure
 Symmetric closure

References 
 Franz Baader and Tobias Nipkow, Term Rewriting and All That, Cambridge University Press, 1998, p. 8

Binary relations
Closure operators
Rewriting systems